Novak Djokovic defeated Stefanos Tsitsipas in the final, 6–7(6–8), 2–6, 6–3, 6–2, 6–4 to win the men's singles tennis title at the 2021 French Open. It was his second French Open title and 19th major title overall.
With the win, he became the first man to achieve the double Career Grand Slam in the Open Era, and the first player in the Open Era to win a major after coming back from two sets to love down in two matches during the same major. Tsitsipas became the first Greek player to reach a major final. It also marked the second consecutive year a man trailed by two sets in a major final yet rallied to win, following Dominic Thiem's victory at the 2020 US Open.

Rafael Nadal was the four-time defending champion, but lost to Djokovic in a 4 hour and 11 minute epic semifinal. Nadal's defeat marked only his third loss out of 108 French Open matches, including his first loss in 14 semifinal appearances at the tournament. It also marked the first time that Nadal lost a match at the French Open after taking the opening set. It was also the first French Open when the player who won against Nadal won the tournament as well.

Djokovic and Daniil Medvedev were in contention for the world No. 1 ranking; Djokovic retained the ranking after Medvedev lost in the quarterfinals.

Nadal and Roger Federer were attempting to win a record 21st major title and become the outright leader in the men's singles major tally. Federer, like Djokovic, was attempting to become the first man in the Open Era to achieve the double Career Grand Slam in what would prove to be his final French Open appearance. This was the first time in majors history that Djokovic, Federer, and Nadal, the three most successful men's singles major champions of all time, were in the same half of the main draw. After both making the semifinals, Djokovic and Nadal met for a record-extending 58th time in the Open Era, with Djokovic emerging victorious in four sets. 

For the first time in the Open Era, all French players were eliminated prior to the third round. Thiem's first-round defeat guaranteed a new French Open finalist from the bottom half of the draw; Tsitsipas emerged to be that player. Carlos Alcaraz became the youngest player since Djokovic in 2005 to win a match at the French Open, and was also the youngest player to reach the third round at the tournament since Andrei Medvedev in 1992. This was the first time since 2004 that a French Open men's singles final went to five sets; on that occasion, Gastón Gaudio also came from two sets down to win the title.

Seeds

Draw

Finals

Top half

Section 1

Section 2

Section 3

Section 4

Bottom half

Section 5

Section 6

Section 7

Section 8

Seeded players
The following are the seeded players. Seedings are based on ATP rankings as of 24 May 2021. Rankings and points before are as of 31 May 2021. Because the tournament was moved a week, points of the week of 10 June 2019 include results from Stuttgart and 's-Hertogenbosch.

As announced by the ATP in March 2021, tournaments from 4 March to 4 August 2019 points due to COVID ranking adjustments will count 50%, including their 2020 points whichever is greater. 2019 points which are higher will still be dropped as normal. Accordingly, the higher of each player's 2019 or 2020 points will be replaced by his 2021 points at the end of the tournament. Note that this is a different ranking adjustment system than the one being used by the WTA for the women's event.

† The player did not qualify for the tournament in 2019. Therefore, this represents his points from the 2019 ATP Challenger Tour.

Withdrawn players
The following players would have been seeded, but withdrew before the tournament began.

Other entry information

Wild cards
The following players were awarded wild cards into the main draw.

Protected ranking

Qualifiers

Lucky losers

Withdrawals
Before the tournament

During the tournament

Retirements

Explanatory notes

References

External links
Main draw
2021 French Open – Men's draws at the Roland Garros
2021 French Open – Men's draws and results at the International Tennis Federation

Men's Singles
French Open by year – Men's singles
French Open – Men's singles